"Sweet Life (La vie est belle)" is a song recorded by Congolese singer Fally Ipupa, from his third studio album Power "Kosa Leka" (2013). Because Music released "Sweet Life (La vie est belle)" as the lead single from the album, on December 17, 2013. The song's music video was directed by Charly Clodion and shot in France. Ipupa posted the music video on his official YouTube channel on 2013.

Conception and release
"Sweet Life (La vie est belle)" is an R&B and hip hop song, which is written and composed by Fally Ipupa. The lyrics to the song are in three languages (Lingala, French and English). The production of the song is still unknown. It was recorded and produced in France. It carries a stuttering beat, which is accompanied by a slow-rolling and heavy bass-pumping groove and an acoustic guitar. The song is the first song of Ipupa including a rap part of himself. The versus are recorded over a Roland TR-808 machine, kick drums, and an acoustic guitar. Also inspired by Papa Wemba La vie est belle from the movie, La Vie est Belle.

The song features Ipupa as the "hard worker" speaking about living a sweet life.

la vie est douce  =  Life is beautiful life is easy
Combats toujours, combats de tous les jours  =  Fighting every day, the everyday fight
Parfois je suis sûr, parfois je doute  =  Sometimes I am sure, sometimes I am not

In 2013, a rumour got abroad in the Congolese community, saying that Fally Ipupa stole the song from a songwriter and released it without permission. In the same year a musician claimed that he had composed the song, showed it to Ipupa and Ipupa then released it. The unknown musician played the demo version in an interview and asked Ipupa publicity to pay him for the song. Ipupa never gave a statement to the rumors.

"Sweet Life (La vie est belle)" was included on Ipupa's third studio album Power "Kosa Leka" (2013) which was released on iTunes Store, YouTube and Google Play Music with no promotion having taken place.

Remixes

On May 29, 2013, rapper Bigg masta G (Muana Mboka), released the official remix of "Sweet Life (La vie est belle)", featuring two rap verses on a slightly modified instrumental. although the remix was already recorded after the release of the original The remix is the first official collaboration between the two Congolese artists and the second collaboration of Ipupa with an English singing artist, after the single "Chaise Electrique" featuring Olivia.

It was recorded in Germany and reproduced by Bigg masta G and J-JD Dacosta. 
Unlike the original version, the remix version does not begin with the sound of an acoustic guitar. The introduction of the remix begins with a sample of Bigg masta G's voice in a cappella.
"Sweet life , sweet dreams , sweet everything , money in the Bank ... ""
It contents two verses featuring Bigg masta G and chorus featuring Fally Ipupa. The instrumental to the remix is slightly different from the original.

Lyrically the remix is similar to the original version. It is about working hard and living a sweet life. "I meet the model chick, I don't even gotta take her "I just give her my number and tell her to holler later, I'm a hustler". Fally Ipupa named himself "3X hustler" as a reference to the way he works hard.

Personnel
Song credits

 Written by Fally Ipupa
 Fally Ipupa – vocals, production, vocal production

Remix credits
 Written by Fally Ipupa; Bigg masta G (Muana Mboka)
 Fally Ipupa – vocals, production, vocal production, instruments
 Bigg masta G (Muana Mboka);– additional production, additional vocals, remixing
 J-JD Dacosta;– recording, mixing, mastering

Video credits
Director – Charly Clodion
Creative director – Charly Clodion	
Executive producer – Charly Clodion

See also

Fally Ipupa
Koffi Olomide
Ferre Gola
Mokobé
Lynnsha
Passi
Youssoupha

References

External links
 Sweet Life "La vie est belle" music video (YouTube)
 Sweet Life "La vie est belle" Lyrics (YouTube)
 Sweet Life "La vie est belle" Remix Lyrics (YouTube)

2013 singles
Fally Ipupa songs